Prunus adenopoda, known locally as ki beusi is a species of plant in the family Rosaceae. It is a tree endemic to Java in Indonesia. It is an endangered species threatened by habitat loss.

References

adenopoda
Endemic flora of Java
Endangered plants
Taxonomy articles created by Polbot